The Panasonic Lumix DC-GH5S is a Micro Four Thirds mirrorless interchangeable lens camera body announced and released by Panasonic in January 2018.

Physical characteristics 

It is the first mirrorless camera body of Panasonic, where the image sensor is equipped with two analogue amplifiers for every pixel (Dual Native ISO). With this technology the model shall be predestinated for video shooting in low light and high dynamic range situations.

The body is made of a magnesium alloy, and it has a fully articulable monitor with touch screen functionality as well as an electronic viewfinder and a hot shoe for a flash light.

Via Wi-Fi the camera can be remotely controlled and accessed by smartphones, tablet computers or mobile and desktop computers with the mobile app Panasonic Image App. Via USB cable there is the possibility of remote shooting with the software Lumix Tether.

Special properties 
Compared to the sister model Panasonic Lumix DMC-GH5 the GH5S differs mainly in the following properties:

 Image sensor
 „Multi-Aspect“ with aspect ratios 4:3, 3:2, 16:9, 17:9
 „Dual Native ISO“ (with two amplifiers per pixel with different amplification factor)
 „low“  with exposure indices ISO 160 to ISO 800, extendible from ISO 80, native sensitivity ISO 400
 „high“ with exposure indices ISO 800 to ISO 51200, extendible to ISO 204800, native sensitivity ISO 2500
 Lower maximum pixel count of 10 megapixels with a larger pixel pitch of 4,7 micrometers
 No 6k photo modus (with 18 megapixels)
 No stabilisation at image sensor, and therefore, no „'Dual-IS“ (synchronisation between the image stabilisation systems of lenses and camera body)
 Video functions
 4k video recordings with 60 frames per second
 Slow motion recordings in Full HD with 240 frames per second
 In- and output for timecode signals

In the following image sequence there is an object taken with f-number 5.6 and with different exposure indices between ISO 160 and ISO 51200. As a result, the images had to be taken with different shutter speeds. At ISO 51200 image noise is easily recognisable at full magnification:

Gallery

References

External links 

GH5S
Cameras introduced in 2018